Susanta Chakraborty (born 1 September 1940) is an Indian politician. He was elected to the Lok Sabha, lower house of the Parliament of India from Howrah, West Bengal in 1989 and 1991 as a member of the Communist Party of India (Marxist).

References

India MPs 1989–1991
India MPs 1991–1996
Communist Party of India (Marxist) politicians from West Bengal
1940 births
Living people
Lok Sabha members from West Bengal
People from Howrah district
People from Hooghly district